Tribe is the fourth studio album by English drum and bass production duo Chase & Status, which was self-released on 18 August 2017 under exclusive license to Mercury Records. The album includes the singles "Control" (featuring Slaves), "All Goes Wrong" (featuring Tom Grennan), "This Moment" (with Blossoms), and "Love Me More" (featuring Emeli Sandé).

Track listing
All songs produced by Chase & Status.

Charts

References

2017 albums
Chase & Status albums
Virgin EMI Records albums
Albums produced by Chase & Status